The 2010 Michigan Wolverines men's soccer team represented the University of Michigan during the 2010 NCAA Division I men's soccer season. It was the 11th season the university fielded a men's varsity soccer team, and their 11th season in the Big Ten Conference. The team was coached by 11th year head coach Steve Burns. The Wolverines finished the season 17–5–3, setting a program record for wins. 

The Wolverines won the 2010 Big Ten Men's Soccer Tournament for the first time in program history. The season was highlighted by the team advancing to the College Cup for the first time in program history, where they lost to eventual tournament champion Akron 1–2.

Squad information

Coaching staff

Schedule 

|-
!colspan=8 style=""| Regular season
|-

|-
!colspan=6 style=""| Big Ten Tournament
|-

|-
!colspan=6 style=""| NCAA Tournament
|-

Rankings

2011 MLS SuperDraft

References

External links  
 UM Men's Soccer

2010
Michigan Wolverines
Michigan Wolverines
Michigan Wolverines men's soccer
2010 NCAA Division I Men's Soccer Tournament participants
NCAA Division I Men's Soccer Tournament College Cup seasons
Big Ten Conference men's soccer champion seasons